The 2202nd Infantry Brigade (Ready Reserve), Philippine Army, known as the Eagle Brigade, is one of the Army Reserve Command's ready reserve infantry Brigades organic to the 22nd infantry Division (Ready Reserve).

The unit specializes in Urban Warfare, Urban Search and Rescue, Humanitarian Assistance and Disaster Relief, and Civil-Military Operations. It operates mostly in the Davao del Sur (Region 11)Province.

Mobilization Center
The 2202nd Infantry Brigade's mobilization center is the 1105th Community Defense Center, 11RCDG, ARESCOM at 76-A Brgy Bucana, Matina, Davao City.

Garrisons
The Brigade Headquarters is strategically located on the Magsaysay Complex near the headquarters of the Task Force-Davao, JTF HARIBON at Sta. Ana Wharf, Davao City, allowing the Brigade to readily deploy the Battalions at any time during a declaration of State of emergency by the national government or as requested by the City Government (LGU).

The Advance Command Post which houses the Support and Rifle Platoons is garrisoned at the southern side of Davao City at Toril Poblacion.

Base Units
 Headquarters & Headquarters Company: (Magsaysay Park)
 * Command Section
 * Headquarters Company
 *  Military Police Section (cell
 *  Civil Military Operations Section
 *  Chaplain Section
 *  Military Intelligence Section

 Headquarters Service Support Company: (Toril)
 *  Headquarters Section
 *  Military Intelligence Section
 *  Support Platoon 
  * Platoon Headquarters
  * Maintenance Section
  * Transportation Section
  * Supply Section
  * MP Section (attached)
 
 *  Search and Rescue (DRRO) Platoon/ Medical Platoon
  * Platoon Headquarters
  * 2 DRRO squads for first responders/ search and rescue
  * Dental Section

Line Units
  1101st Infantry Battalion  (Ready Reserve) (Digos)
  1105th Infantry Battalion  (Ready Reserve) (Davao)
  Alpha Battery (Field Artillery) (attached)
  1st Mechanized Infantry Company(Ready Reserve) (Davao)

See also

 1502nd Infantry Brigade (Ready Reserve)
 22nd Infantry Division (Philippines)
 202nd Infantry Battalion (Ready Reserve)
 1st Technical & Administrative Services Battalion (Ready Reserve)
 2203rd Infantry Brigade (Ready Reserve)

References

Citation
 

Military units and formations of the Philippine Army
Brigades of the Philippines
Reserve and Auxiliary Units of the Philippine Military